Leonardo Rodrigues may refer to:

 Léo Rodrigues (footballer, born 1991), Brazilian football right-back
 Léo Rodrigues (footballer, born 1999), Portuguese football goalkeeper